The Tough One (Spanish: El aventurero de Guaynas) is a 1966 Spanish/Italian spaghetti Western directed by Joaquín Luis Romero Marchent and starring John Richardson.

External links
 
 The Tough One at Spaghetti Western

1966 films
1966 Western (genre) films
Spanish Western (genre) films
Italian Western (genre) films
Spaghetti Western films
Neo-Western films
Films directed by Joaquín Luis Romero Marchent
Films scored by Gianni Ferrio
1960s Italian films